Kayalar can refer to:

 Kayalar, Karayazı, Turkey
 Kayalar, Maden, Turkey
 Kayalar, someone from Kayalpatnam, Tamil Nadu, India